Carlos Cure Cure (born 1944) is the Ambassador of Colombia to Venezuela. A civil engineer, Cure has also served as chair of Bavaria, S.A., the biggest brewery of Colombia and second largest in South America before its merger, and Avianca, S.A., the national flag carrier of Colombia.

Personal life
Son of Syrio-Lebanese migrants, he was born in 1944 in Sabanalarga, Atlántico. On 6 February 1983 he married former beauty pageant contestant Margaret Elizabeth Núñez Hughes.

References

See also
Fuad Ricardo Char Abdala
Juan Mayr Maldonado

1944 births
Living people
Colombian people of Lebanese descent
Colombian people of Syrian descent
People from Atlántico Department
Colombian businesspeople
Colombian civil engineers
Ambassadors of Colombia to Venezuela